Sandro Chia (born 20 April 1946) is an Italian painter and sculptor. In the late 1970s and early 1980s he was, with Francesco Clemente, Enzo Cucchi, Nicola De Maria, and Mimmo Paladino, a principal member of the Italian Neo-Expressionist movement which was baptised Transavanguardia by Achille Bonito Oliva.

Life 

Chia was born in Florence, in Tuscany in central Italy, on 20 April 1946. He then travelled in Europe, in Turkey and in India. He settled in Rome in 1970, and began to show work in the following year. He spent the winter of 1980–1981 in Mönchengladbach, in Nordrhein-Westfalen in West Germany, on a study grant. Later that year he moved to New York in the United States, where he lived for more than twenty years. In 1984–1985 he taught at the School of Visual Arts in Manhattan.

Work 

Chia's early work tended towards Conceptualism, but from the mid-1970s he began to turn towards more a figurative approach. In June 1979  showed work by Chia, Francesco Clemente, Enzo Cucchi, Nicola De Maria and Mimmo Paladino at his gallery in Cologne, in Germany. In an article in Flash Art in the same year, the critic Achille Bonito Oliva characterised the group as a new art movement, which he called "Transavanguardia".

Notes

References

External links
Artist official website
Sandro Chia artworks by museum, Artcyclopedia

1946 births
Living people
20th-century Italian sculptors
20th-century Italian male artists
Italian male sculptors
Painters from Florence
Italian watercolourists
Italian contemporary artists
Recipients of the Italian Order of Merit for Culture and Art
Transavanguardia
Neo-expressionist artists
Accademia di Belle Arti di Firenze alumni